Courrier sud may refer to:

Courrier sud (novel), a 1929 novel by Antoine de Saint-Exupery
Courrier sud (film), a 1937 film directed by Pierre Billon

See also
Le Courrier du Sud, French-language newspaper in Quebec, Canada
Southern Mail (disambiguation)